Alfred George Boyce (3 March 1895 – 3 June 1977) was an Australian rules footballer who played for the South Melbourne Football Club and Fitzroy Football Club in the Victorian Football League (VFL).

Notes

External links 
		

1895 births
1977 deaths
Australian rules footballers from Melbourne
Sydney Swans players
Fitzroy Football Club players
People from Clifton Hill, Victoria